The Swift Current Court House is a municipal designated historic building located in the city of Swift Current, Saskatchewan, Canada.   The building is a two story brick building in an Edwardian Classical style made with brick from Claybank, Saskatchewan. In the early days the building also served as the land registry office.

References 

Government buildings completed in 1916
Buildings and structures in Swift Current